Arkadiusz Kubik (born 31 May 1972 in Kraków) is a Polish footballer who currently plays for Dąb Paszkówka. His brother, Łukasz, is also a professional footballer currently playing Bronowianka Kraków. Besides Poland, he has played in Belgium.

References

 
 

1972 births
Living people
Polish footballers
MKS Cracovia (football) players
Górnik Zabrze players
Zagłębie Lubin players
Royal Antwerp F.C. players
Widzew Łódź players
Jagiellonia Białystok players
Górnik Wieliczka players
Association football midfielders
Polish expatriate footballers
Expatriate footballers in Belgium
Polish expatriate sportspeople in Belgium
Footballers from Kraków
K.R.C. Zuid-West-Vlaanderen players
Poland international footballers